Natee Utarit (born 9 April 1970) is a contemporary artist from Bangkok, Thailand.  He has participated in group and solo exhibitions in East Asia and Europe.

Utarit's artworks have been described as involving the relationships between historical arts such as Renaissance art from the Western world and postcolonialism. 

Commentators state that Utarit questions the world of contemporary art through his aesthetics skills, creating metaphors on all his artworks.

Biography
Natee Utarit was born in 1970 in Bangkok. He graduated from Silpakorn University majoring in Graphic Arts (Fine Arts) at the Painting and Sculpture Faculty.

Utarit has received the Art Game Changer Award from Asia Society.

Professional career and exhibitions
Natee's works have been described as a combination of philosophy, beliefs, religious views, history, knowledge of various elements from various centuries, and experimentation (on connecting between his artworks and historical cultures from the Western world). The artist also uses photographs as a communication tool, creating a visionary view presenting cultures and an informative background on the relationships between Western and Eastern cultures, respectively. 

According to one analysis, Natee's works can be regarded as finding newer perspective by creating a figurative which differs from the original / tradition views. With that, the artist's use of sociopolitical and religious points of view to craft up his works of art, reflecting both contemporary points of view and hidden messages for the audience to comprehends through various visuals and forms.

Natee's works include "Optimism is Ridiculous: The Altarpieces", from solo exhibitions  in both museums and art institutions.

Bibliography 

 Natee Utarit: Optimism is Ridiculous" by Demetrio Paparoni 2018
 Natee Utarit: After Painting"written by Singapore Art Museum 2010
 Natee Utarit: Illustration of the Crisis" published by Richard Koh Fine Arts  2013.

Selected solo and group exhibitions

Literature
 Natee Utarit: Optimism is Ridiculous (2017), 
 Natee Utarit: Illustration of the Crisis (2013), 
 Natee Utarit: After Painting (2010),

References

Natee Utarit
Natee Utarit
1970 births
Living people
Natee Utarit